Jorge Beauchef (1787 in Velay, France - June 10, 1840 in Santiago, Chile) was a French military who participated in the Napoleonic Wars. He is best known in Latin America for his participation in the Chilean War of Independence, where he won many battles (Battle of Maipú, capture of Valdivia etc). This first battle, one of the most famous, ensured Chile's independence, putting an end to the continuous Spanish domination since 1536.

A pioneer of the Chilean Navy, he distinguished himself under the orders of the famous British mercenary Lord Cochrane. He won the battle of Valdivia with him, for which they were both decorated.
He was governor of Lima (to a lesser extent, he participated in the Peruvian War of Independence by commanding an expedition to help José de San Martín, a national hero of Argentina and Peru).

In his honour, a street in downtown Santiago has been renamed "Beauchef Street". The main buildings of the Faculty of Physical and Mathematical Sciences of the University of Chile are located there and are called "Campus Beauchef". A series entitled "La huella de Beauchef" (in English: "The Beauchef footprint") of 6 one-hour episodes was released about him in 20061. 
His war memoirs have been reprinted several times in the 20th and 21st centuries, mainly in Spanish and English but also a little in French.

Activity in South America 
In 1808 he became prisoner in Spain but managed to escape to United States where he was invited to join South American patriots in the Army of the Andes. He did however not manage to arrive in time for the army's crossing of the Andes into Chile and the decisive battle of Chacabuco. When he arrived he soon begun to participate in engagement with the royalist; first in the siege of Talcahuano (1817) and later on in the decisive patriot victory at the Battle of Maipú (1818).

In 1819 he joined the newly formed Chilean Navy under the command of Lord Cochrane. In February 1820 he led an amphibious assault on the heavily fortified Corral Bay leading to the capture of Valdivia. He stayed in Valdivia to chase remaining royalists while Cochrane sailed further south to Chiloé Island. Beauchef then left Valdivia to expel the royalists from Osorno. The royalist forces of Valdivia had fled to Osorno and then gathered at Carelmapu fort where they received orders from Antonio de Quintanilla to confront Beauchef. In the Battle of El Toro (1820) Beauchef succeeded in defeating the royalist expedition.

In 1823 he was sent in charge of a reinforcement to José de San Martín's army in Peru. There he served as governor of Lima for a short time. Back in Chile he participated in the 1824 expedition to Chiloé Island where he was defeated in the Battle of Mocopulli. Chiloé would only be incorporated into Chile after Ramón Freire's 1826 expedition.

Later years 
In 1828 Beauchef left the army and three years later, in 1831 he went on visit to France where he remained two years before returning to Chile. He died in Santiago on June 10 of 1840.

Legacy
In 1970, a statue was erected in his honour in Valdivia, following his greatest victory, the capture of Valdivia in 1820.

References 

1787 births
1840 deaths
People of the Chilean War of Independence
People of the Peruvian War of Independence
French military personnel of the Napoleonic Wars